Jeri Gaile (born August 30, 1957) is an American actress, best known for playing Rose McKay in the soap opera Dallas from 1989 to 1991.  Gaile is currently Director of the Spotlight Awards program for the Los Angeles Music Center.

In 1990, Gaile guest starred on the drama Murder, She Wrote as Brittany Brown.
In 1991, Gaile appeared on the situation comedy Night Court as Miranda.

References

External links

1957 births
Actresses from Los Angeles
Living people
American television actresses
21st-century American women